John Smedley may refer to:
Jonathan Smedley (1671–1729), Anglo-Irish churchman and satirical victim
John Smedley (industrialist), 19th century English industrialist
John Smedley (business executive), former president of Daybreak Game Company
John Smedley (British Army officer)